Laar is a hamlet in the Dutch province of North Brabant. It is located in the municipality of Cranendonck, 1 km southwest of the town of Maarheeze.

References

Populated places in North Brabant
Cranendonck